Natural Arch, Tirumala hills, a notified National Geo-heritage Monument, is a distinctive geological feature  north of the Tirumala hills temple, near the Chakra Teertham in Tirupati district in the state of Andhra Pradesh, India. The arch is also called Silathoranam (శిలాతోరణం) in the local language (Telugu language: sila means ‘rock’ and thoranam means a garland strung over a threshold, connecting two vertical columns or an ‘arch’ as in this case).

Legend

Mythology related to the arch, linked to the famous Tirumala hills temple of Lord Venkateswara, has three versions.

According to one version, the arch resembles the hood of a serpent, a conch (Sanskrit: Shank) and a discus (Sanskrit: chakra) – all symbols of worship in Hindu religion – and considered to be the source of the Idol of Lord Venkateswara or Lord Balaji at the Tirumala hill temple.

The second version is that the main deity in the Tirumala temple is of the same height as the height of the arch.

The third version is that Lord Vishnu, known as Balaji or Venkateswara (the central deity of Srivaishnava tradition) at the Tirumala temple town, is supposed to have put his first foot down at a place called Padalu or Sreevaripadalu (శ్రీ వారి పాదాలు)(Telugu language: Divine foot prints) which is the highest point of Tirumala hills, the second step at the location of the arch. Thereafter, the next step is stated to have been placed where his idol is now worshipped in the temple at Tirumala.

History

In the 1980s, during excavations for a geological fault in the Tirumala hills, geologists found this rare geological formation of the rock arch which has two dissimilar sets of rocks with a connecting thin link. The assessed geological age of the rock arch is 2.5 million years. Formation of the arch is attributed to intensified weathering and erosion of stream action that has withstood the torque of nature. This is a rare geological fault which is technically called in the geological idiom as ‘Eparchaean Unconformity’.
At this location, the boundary is between sedimentary rocks of the Cudappah Supergroup, 1600 million years in age, and Archaean rocks comprising granites, gneisses and dolerite dykes that are more than 2100 million years old. This unconformity gives an indication of the enormous time gap in the creation of the earth's crust.

Geology

The natural geological arch has two distinct physiographical regions – southwest upland and northeast lowland. The Tirupati hills, at the foot of a picturesque range of hills, are known by several names such as 'Seshachala', 'Venkatachala' and 'Balaji'. The geological formations are categorized under four heads namely, the (1) Archeans (the gneisses), (2) the Eparchean unconformity (Quartzose sandstones Overlying the granite with a distinct unconformity), (3) Puranas (formation of Cuddapah group well developed in the valley) and (4) Quaternary deposits. The Tirumala hills essentially of precambrian period are composed of sedimentary rocks – quartzites and intercalated shales, which are given the geological, stratigraphical nomenclature of Nagari quartzites.

The steep scarp of the hill ranges depicts unconformity in its topographic, structural and denudational features, which is the Eparchian Unconformity.

A prominent Eparchaean Unconformity of the formation resting on the Archaean peninsular gneissic complex is noted. Rocks of Cuddapah Supergroup including Kurnool Group are the prominent feature of the basin.

Specifically, the arch's origin is attributed to two schools of thought namely, a) it could be the effect of a wave action from oceanic transgression or intensified climatic settings and corrosion and b) it may have been naturally carved out of quartzite.

Visitor information 

The best time to visit the arch is between 6 A.M. and 8 A.M., fog permitting. There is a well maintained garden in front of the arch should visitors wish to rest or wait until fog clears. Sunset is also a good time to visit, as the arch looks even more striking and mystifying in the light of the setting sun. Seen in the light of a full moon the arch is said to be "ethereally beautiful."

Access

The location of the arch is well connected by road, rail and air routes. The nearest railhead to Tirumala hills is Tirupati.
Regular bus services (both private and Govt. transport services operate) are operated by all the states bordering Andhra Pradesh.
The approach road from the temple is wide and is an avenue of trees. Private vehicles are allowed to the location. A 20-minute walk from the Varahaswamy temple in Tirumala (see map pictured) would be a pleasant experience.

See also
 List of National Geological Monuments in India
 List of rock formations in India
 Natural arch
 Venkateswara Temple, Tirumala

References

External links
Views of Geological Rock Arch, Tirupathi, Andhra Pradesh
The Natural Arch and Bridge Society

Geology of Andhra Pradesh
Natural arches
Rock formations of India
Buildings and structures in Tirupati
Geography of Tirupati district